Phidippides cardiomyopathy refers to the cardiomyopathic changes that occurs after long periods of endurance training. It was named after Phidippides, the famous Greek runner who died after running from Marathon to Athens in 490 BC.

It was coined by Justin E. Trivax, and Peter A. McCullough in 2012.

This has been quoted in the literature multiple times and has been inaccurately thought that Dr. James O'Keefe had coined the term. He was speaking about the sudden death of Micah True, a 58-year-old ultrarunner and cult hero a.k.a. Caballo Blanco who died on a 12-mile training jog in the rugged Gila Wilderness of southwest New Mexico. After an autopsy, the Albuquerque coroner wrote that “Micah True died as a result of cardiomyopathy during exertion”. Since then, multiple websites have warned their readers on the possible damage from prolonged endurance training.

The suggested etiology for Phidippides cardiomyopathy is the cardiac remodeling from prolonged strenuous exercises.

The repeated prolonged states of volume overload in the right atrium and right ventricle from endurance training will lead to chronic structural changes. Long term changes include patches of cardiac fibrosis which can allow zones of re-entry for cardiac arrhythmias.

It is suggested that Cardiac MRI is the best imaging modality to investigate this condition.

Controversy 
There is not much evidence describing this condition and other than a case report, no other studies have corroborated the pathophysiological changes suggested by McCullough.

Not all experts agree with Trivax and McCullough.  Many feel that further research is necessary to understand this condition better.

References 

Cardiology